Barefoot on the Beach is a smooth jazz album by American singer-songwriter Michael Franks, released in 1999 by Windham Hill Records.

Background
Franks' relationship with Warner Bros. Records (and its subsidiary Reprise Records) which began with the 1976 album The Art of Tea ended with Barefoot on the Beach. The album was his first and only release by Windham Hill, a Sony Music label; subsequent albums would be released by Koch (E1 Music) and Shanachie Records. His compilation albums continued to be released by Warner Bros. The album includes Valerie Simpson, who sings a duet in "Now Love Has No End", Joe Sample, and Jimmy Haslip of The Yellowjackets.

Although the album evokes summer, it also contains biting commentary on Broadcast Architecture's dominance of American smooth jazz radio at the time with "Mr. Smooth". Lyrics such as "some of us remember how much choice there was, before he took the throne" and "his verdict we must wait" lament the dominance and perceived heavy-handed influence of the network on the genre.

Track listing

Personnel

 Michael Franks – vocals
 Randy Brecker – trumpet
 Larry Lunetta – trumpet
 Birch Johnson – trombone
 James Hynes – flugelhorn
 Michael Brecker – saxophone
 Chris Hunter – saxophone, flute
 Bob Mintzer – saxophone
 Andy Snitzer – saxophone
 David Mann – flute
 Bob James – piano
 Charles Blenzig – keyboards
 Chris Palmaro – keyboards
 Mike Ricchiuti – keyboards
 Jay Azzolina – guitar
 Chuck Loeb – guitar
 Steve Khan – guitar
 Jeff Mironov – guitar
 Jimmy Haslip – bass guitar, keyboards
 Will Lee – bass guitar
 John Patitucci – double bass
 Dave Samuels – vibraphone
 Brian Dunne – drums
 Shawn Pelton – drums
 Wolfgang Haffner – drums
 Steve Gadd – drums
 David Charles – percussion
 Bashiri Johnson – percussion
 Valerie Simpson – vocals
 Tawatha Agee – backing vocals
 Carmen Cuesta – backing vocals
 Lani Groves – backing vocals
 Jim Beard – strings

Reception

Writing for AllMusic, Jonathan Widran praised Franks' vocal style and longevity. "Countless musical trends have steamrolled by since this wry singer songwriter with the cool and collected, wistful onionskin voice first graced the adult music world in the mid-'70s [..] yet Franks has stood his ground, growing as an observational lyricist while his relaxed demeanor stays pretty much the same, and charmingly so." He concluded the album is "the kind of spring in your step music Franks fashioned his career out of."

References

Bibliography

Michael Franks (musician) albums
1999 albums
Windham Hill Records albums